Iyesha Ollivierre (born 3 July 1990) is a US-raised Trinidad and Tobago former footballer who played as a forward and a midfielder. She has been a member of the Trinidad and Tobago women's national team.

Early life
Ollivierre was raised in Medford, New York.

High school and college career
Ollivierre has attended the Victory Christian Academy in East Patchogue,  New York, the Youngstown State University in Youngstown, Ohio and the Concordia College in Bronxville, New York.

International career
Ollivierre represented Trinidad and Tobago at the 2010 CONCACAF Women's U-20 Championship qualification. She capped at senior level during the 2014 Central American and Caribbean Games.

Personal life
Ollivierre majored in Business Administration in the Concordia College.

References

External links

1990 births
Living people
Trinidad and Tobago women's footballers
Women's association football forwards
Women's association football midfielders
Trinidad and Tobago women's international footballers
Competitors at the 2014 Central American and Caribbean Games
People from Medford, New York
Sportspeople from Suffolk County, New York
Soccer players from New York (state)
American women's soccer players
Youngstown State Penguins women's soccer players

Concordia College (New York) alumni
College women's soccer players in the United States
African-American women's soccer players
American sportspeople of Trinidad and Tobago descent
21st-century African-American sportspeople
21st-century African-American women